Ray Nunatak is a nunatak, an Eskimo word meaning an isolated rocky peak that projects above the surface of a glacier where the ice cover is relatively thin. Ray Nunatak is 1,630 m, located just north of Beiszer Nunatak and 5 nautical miles (9 km) southwest of Dyrdal Peak in southern Forrestal Range, Pensacola Mountains. Mapped by United States Geological Survey (USGS) from surveys and U.S. Navy air photos, 1956–66. Named by Advisory Committee on Antarctic Names (US-ACAN) for James A. Ray, utilities man at Ellsworth Station, winter 1957.

Today

Ray Nunatak is part of Antarctica which has been named Queen Elizabeth Land  as a Diamond Jubilee gift to Queen Elizabeth from the Foreign Office.
 

Nunataks of Queen Elizabeth Land